Love Opus is the ninth and final studio album by Heavy D. It was released on September 27, 2011 on Stride Entertainment, almost two months before Heavy D's death.

Track listing

References

Heavy D albums
2011 albums